James To Kun-sun (born 11 March 1963) is a Hong Kong lawyer and Democratic Party politician. From 1991 to 2020, To was a member of the Legislative Council of Hong Kong, representing the District Council (Second) constituency. In his final four years, To was the most senior member in the Legislative Council, and was also the convenor of the pro-democracy caucus from 2016 to 2017. He was also a former member of the Yau Tsim Mong District Council representing Olympic. 

In November 2020, To, along with the rest of the pro-democracy caucus resigned in protest of the disqualification of four of their members.

Early life and political career
To was born in Hong Kong in 1963. He was educated at the Church of Christ in China Kei Wa Primary School and Wah Yan College, Kowloon before he was enrolled to the University of Hong Kong where he graduated with a law degree, LL.B. in 1985 and PCLL in 1986, and became a lawyer after graduation.

He was involved in the local democracy movement in support of the Tiananmen protests of 1989. In 1990, he co-founded the United Democrats of Hong Kong, the first major pro-democracy party in Hong Kong later transformed into the Democratic Party. He was first elected to the Sham Shui Po District Board in 1991 in Cheung Sha Wan.

Legislative Council

Colonial years
To ran in the first direct elections of the Legislative Council of Hong Kong in 1991, where he was elected with Frederick Fung of another pro-democracy party Association for Democracy and People's Livelihood (ADPL) in Kowloon West. He was Hong Kong's youngest legislator at the age of 28 when first elected. He kept his record until 2016 when Nathan Law of Demosisto was elected at the age of 23.

He was re-elected in the 1995 Legislative Council election with 69 percent of the popular vote in his Kowloon Southwest constituency. He served on the Legislative Council until 30 June 1997 at the eve of the handover of Hong Kong when he had to step down with his party and replaced by the Provisional Legislative Council.

After 1997
He ran again the first SAR Legislative Council election in 1998 he was re-elected with Lau Chin-shek on the same ticket with 55 percent of the popular vote in Kowloon West. He has specialised in the security issues, having been the party's spokesman on security issue and chaired the Panel on Security, one of the key committees in the Legislative Council. He had closely followed the works of the Independent Commission Against Corruption, immigration issues, Vietnamese refugees, crime and triads. He also campaigned for the setup of the Independent Police Complaints Commission against police abuses of power. Due to his Christian belief, he was known for his anti-gay rights voting records despite his pro-democracy political affiliation. He was the only member of the pro-democracy camp to vote abstain in the SODO motion on 7 Nov 2012.

He was re-elected in Kowloon West in 2000, 2004 and 2008. In June 2010, he expressed open skepticism of the Democratic Party's support for the government's 2012 constitutional reform package but nevertheless toed the party line and voted for the measure. In the reform package, the party had secured the inclusion of a late amendment to hold a popular vote for five new District Council functional constituencies. In a dissenting speech to Legco, he warned of the creation of "super-functional constituencies" with an apparently larger mandate than that of geographical constituency lawmakers.

Nonetheless, in the 2012 Legislative Council election, he represented the party to run in the newly created territory-wide District Council (Second) constituency. His ticket received 316,468 votes in total, the largest votes in the electoral history of Hong Kong until it was exceeded by his party colleague Kwong Chun-yu in 2016.

2016 election and caucus convenor

In 2016, he was re-elected in the District Council (Second) constituency with a sharp decline of vote due to the strategic voting of the pro-democracy voters who turned to vote for Kwong Chun-yu who was trailing behind To. As a result, To took the marginal seat with 243,930 votes, only 10,694 votes, 0.6 per cent higher than the unelected pro-Beijing candidate Wong Kwok-hing of the Hong Kong Federation of Trade Unions.

He became the most senior member of the Legislative Council, after Albert Ho retired from the legislature and Lee Cheuk-yan was surprisingly unseated, and became the last Legislative Council member from the "Class of 91", pro-democrats who first were elected in the first Legislative Council direct election in 1991. He also became the only legislator who has been directly elected in all elections since 1991 in the most senior member in the house. In October 2016, he became the convenor of the reorganised pro-democracy caucus, holding that position until 2017.

2020 Democratic caucus resignation
On November 12th, To and 14 other members of the Democratic caucus resigned en masse in protest against the disqualification of four Democratic caucus candidates which occurred the previous day. Speaking to reporters, To said, "[The disqualifications] are an arbitrary form of repression by which the Communist Party sought to control everything."

Arrest
On 6 January 2021, To was among 53 members of the pro-democratic camp who were arrested under the national security law, specifically its provision regarding alleged subversion. The group stood accused of the organisation of and participation in unofficial primary elections held by the camp in July 2020. To was released on bail on 7 January.

On 29 September 2021, To was disqualified along with 10 other district councillors for his invalid oath-taking after he was involved with participating in the last year pro-democracy primaries.

Personal life
On 12 December 2009, To married Sue So. The couple had a son in 2012.

See also
 Father of the House
 Senior Unofficial Member

References

External links

 James To's homepage (Chinese only)
 Legco biography

1963 births
Living people
Solicitors of Hong Kong
Hong Kong Christians
Alumni of the University of Hong Kong
District councillors of Yau Tsim Mong District
Charter 08 signatories
Democratic Party (Hong Kong) politicians
United Democrats of Hong Kong politicians
HK LegCo Members 1991–1995
HK LegCo Members 1995–1997
HK LegCo Members 1998–2000
HK LegCo Members 2000–2004
HK LegCo Members 2004–2008
HK LegCo Members 2008–2012
HK LegCo Members 2012–2016
HK LegCo Members 2016–2021
Hong Kong political prisoners